Calzada de Oropesa is a municipality and village in the province of Toledo and autonomous community of Castile-La Mancha, Spain.

References

Municipalities in the Province of Toledo
Populated places in the Province of Toledo